Cephalotes umbraculatus is a species of arboreal ant of the genus Cephalotes, characterized by an odd shaped head and the ability to "parachute" by steering their fall if they drop off of a tree. They are also known as gliding ants.

References

umbraculatus